Hiten Kumar, born Hiten Mehta, is an Indian actor in Gujarati cinema.

Career
He started in the Gujarati film industry with a role in Unchi Medina Uncha Mol (1998). His 1998 film Desh Re Joya Dada Pardesh Joya was a commercial superhit. He acted in several Gujarati films in his long career.

He hosted a crime show, Crime Time... Fight Against Crime, on VTV Gujarati in 2014-2015.

Personal life
He lives in Mumbai and married Sonba in 1989.

Filmography
 Halo manvyune mele (2007)
 Desh Re Joya Dada Pardesh Joya
Daldu Chorayu Dhire Dhire (2000), directed by Jiten Purohit
Me to Palavde Bandhi Preet (2005)
Preet Jhuke Nahi Saath Chhute Nahi (2006)
Ek Var Piyu Ne Malva Aavje (2006)
Mota Ghar Ni Vahu (2007), written by Jiten Purohit
Unchi Medina Uncha Mol
Maiyar Ma Mandu Nathi Lagtu
Mandavda Ropavo Manaraj
Chundadi Odhado Ho Raj
Panddu Leelu ne Rang Raato
Dikro Maro Ladakvayo
Chaar (2011)
Preet Jhuke Nahi Saath Chhute Nahi (2011)
Premi Zukya Nathi ne Zukshe Nahi (2011)
Kon Halave Limdi Ne Kon Zulave Pipli (2014)
Lohi No Nahi E Koi No Nahi (2014)
Padkar.. The Challenge (2014)
Prem Rang (2016)
Simran (2017)
Hameer
Chitkar (2018)
Dhuandhaar (2021)
Raado (2022)
Vash (2023)
Aagantuk(2023)

References

External links

Living people
Year of birth missing (living people)
Indian male film actors
21st-century Indian male actors
Male actors in Gujarati-language films
People from Gujarat